Dr Zahid Chauhan OBE, FRCGP is a British general practitioner, Labour Party politician and has been councillor for Alexandra ward on Oldham Council since 2013.  He  is currently serving as Deputy Mayor.

Charity 
Dr Chauhan is the founder of the Charity Homeless Friendly. He campaigned during the COVID-19 pandemic in England to ensure that people who are homeless were vaccinated and organised clinics to vaccinate rough sleepers at high risk from the virus. Dr Chauhan considers this work vaccinating people who are homeless as a 'badge of honour' and having done the right thing to save lives.  

He was named by The Big Issue as one of their Changemakers for 2021 for vaccinating people who are homeless two months before their vulnerability was recognised in government advice.

Honours and distinctions 

Dr Zahid Chauhan was appointed Officer of the Order of the British Empire (OBE) for his "services to people who are homeless" in the New Years Honours 2020  and was invested by Charles, Prince of Wales, on 12th March 2020.

Dr Chauhan was elected to Fellowship of the College of General Practitioners in 2021.

He was also named as the Asian Business Leaders, Business Solving a Social Problem at their awards in 2018

Campaigns 

He was the initiator of the campaign to set up a commemorative plaque at the Royal Oldham Hospital for the two nurses involved in the in vitro fertilisation of Louise Brown.

References

Councillors in Oldham
Labour Party (UK) councillors
21st-century British politicians
British politicians of Pakistani descent
Living people
British general practitioners
Officers of the Order of the British Empire
Year of birth missing (living people)